Sekolah Menengah Kebangsaan Seberang Jaya a.k.a. SMKSJ is a secondary school located in Seberang Jaya, Penang, Malaysia.

History

Principal
 Tuan Haji Mohd Daud bin Haji Mohamed (1989–1994)
 Tuan Haji Harun bin Mat Isa (1994–1996)
 Tuan Ammar bin Abd Latif (1996–1998)
 Encik Tan Keat Kooi (1998–2003)
 Encik Ooi Lean Kok (2003-2003)
 Dato Haji Osman bin Hussein (2004–2007)
 Puan Sofiah binti Ebau (2007–2010)
 Puan Fadilah binti Mohd Zain (2010–2011)
 Puan Balkis binti Abdul Rahim (2011-2014)
 Puan Suibah binti Sulaiman (2014-2019)
 Tuan Hazani bin Ibrahim (2019-Current)

School Stream
 Science, Arts, MPV, ICT, Accountings

Central Seberang Perai District
Schools in Penang
Secondary schools in Malaysia